The lesser moa (family Emeidae) were a family in the moa order Dinornithiformes. About two-thirds of all moa species are in the lesser moa family. The moa were ratites from New Zealand. Ratites are flightless birds with a sternum without a keel. They also have a distinctive palate. The origin of the ratites is becoming clearer as it is now believed that early ancestors of these birds were able to fly and flew to the southern areas that they have been found in.

Species 

The currently recognised genera and species are:

 Genus Anomalopteryx
 Bush moa, Anomalopteryx didiformis (North and South Island, New Zealand)
 Genus Emeus
 Eastern moa, Emeus crassus (South Island, New Zealand)
 Genus Euryapteryx
 Broad-billed moa, Euryapteryx curtus (North and South Island, New Zealand)
 Genus Pachyornis
 Heavy-footed moa, Pachyornis elephantopus (South Island, New Zealand)
 Mantell's moa, Pachyornis geranoides (North Island, New Zealand)
 Crested moa, Pachyornis australis (South Island, New Zealand)

Notes

References 

Holocene extinctions
Ratites
Bird genera
Extinct birds of New Zealand
Extinct flightless birds
Higher-level bird taxa restricted to New Zealand
Late Quaternary prehistoric birds
Species made extinct by human activities